Dee Creek is a tributary of Salt Creek in Cass County in the U.S. state of Nebraska. Not much is known about Dee Creek, as much of it is underground. It is speculated that Dee Creek is fed directly from the Ogallala Aquifer.

References

Rivers of Nebraska